Human cannonball is a performance act in which a person (the "cannonball") is ejected from a specially designed "cannon". 

Human Cannonball may also refer to:

Human Cannonball (album), a 1993 album by the alternative rock group, School of Fish
Human Cannonball (DC Comics), a comic book character owned by DC Comics
Human Cannonball (Marvel Comics), a comic book character owned by Marvel Comics
Human Cannonball (video game), by Atari
"Human Cannonball", a song by Butthole Surfers from the album Locust Abortion Technician
"Human Cannonball", a song by Webb Wilder from the album Hybrid Vigor
Frank "Cannonball" Richards, a performer notable for being shot with a cannonball